Mispila sonthianae is a species of beetle in the family Cerambycidae, native to Laos. It was described by Stephan von Breuning in 1963.

References

sonthianae
Beetles described in 1963